Alex Williams (born October 25, 1963 in Rochester, New York) is an American former alpine skier who competed in the 1988 Winter Olympics.

External links
 sports-reference.com
 

1963 births
Living people
American male alpine skiers
Olympic alpine skiers of the United States
Alpine skiers at the 1988 Winter Olympics
Sportspeople from Rochester, New York
20th-century American people